Noak Hill is a village in outer East London, in the London Borough of Havering. It is located 17.1 miles northeast of Charing Cross.

History
Noak Hill was a ward in the ancient parish of Hornchurch. By the 16th century, it had come under the control of the Romford vestry and was included in the newly created Romford civil parish in 1849. From 1895, Noak Hill became a separate civil parish, and had its own parish council until 1934.

The name "Noak" is a corruption of the Middle English atten oak, meaning "at the oak [tree]".

Geography
Noak Hill is situated on hilly terrain in the far northeastern edge of Greater London, with the M25 motorway being the boundary. The village consists of various period homes, many of which are listed buildings, a 19th-century church and scattered farms. It is located immediately north of the post-war estate of Harold Hill and east of Havering-atte-Bower.

Transport
Noak Hill is served by several London Buses routes: the 256 (to Hornchurch), 294 (to Romford) and 499 (to Romford or Gallows Corner).

References

Areas of London
Districts of the London Borough of Havering
Villages in London